The Klarinettenquartett Cl-4 was one of a few clarinet chamber jazz ensembles in the 1980s. This international ensemble based in Germany existed from 1985 to 1988. The group integrated elements of jazz, folk and European concert music in their music without wanting to belong to the Third Stream.

Discography

References

Free jazz ensembles
Chamber jazz ensembles
German jazz ensembles
Avant-garde jazz ensembles
Musical groups established in 1984
1984 establishments in Germany